John William White (1 August 1877 – 2 December 1958) was an English first-class cricketer active 1902–06 who played for Nottinghamshire. He was born in New Annesley; died in Mansfield.

References

1877 births
1958 deaths
English cricketers
Nottinghamshire cricketers